During the 1903–04 season Hibernian, a football club based in Edinburgh, finished tenth out of 14 clubs in the Scottish First Division.

Scottish First Division

Final League table

Scottish Cup

See also
List of Hibernian F.C. seasons

References

External links
Hibernian 1903/1904 results and fixtures, Soccerbase

Hibernian F.C. seasons
Hibernian